Litt is a surname. Notable people with this surname include:

 David Litt (born 1986), American political speechwriter and author
 Robert S. Litt, American intelligence analyst
 Scott Litt (born 1954), American record producer
 Toby Litt (born 1968), English writer

See also
 Lit (disambiguation)